Homewood High School (HHS) is a public high school, serving grades 9-12, in the Homewood, Alabama suburb of Birmingham. It is the only high school in the Homewood City School System. The principal is Joel Henneke. In the summer of 2007, the front of the school was remodeled, and a new building, Pathways Alternative School, was constructed in the upper level of the student parking lot. The front office and lobby were also remodeled in the summer of 2008. In the summer of 2018, construction on a new fine arts wing began.

Homewood's colors are red, white, and blue and all competitive teams are known as the Patriots. HHS competes in AHSAA Class 6A.

Academics
The graduating class of 2009 had 236 students, with 206 students taking at least 1 AP exam. As a whole, the class of 2009 took 475 AP exams. The AP exam "pass score" of 3 or higher was 74.9% in 2009. The S.A.T. Critical Reading mean was 572 and the Math mean was 568. The average ACT composite score was 22.8. There were 3 National Merit Finalists, 1 National Achievement Finalist, and 7 National Merit Commended students in 2009.

Extracurricular activities

Athletics
Homewood High School fields varsity teams in football, cheerleading, basketball, baseball, soccer, wrestling, golf, tennis, softball, volleyball, lacrosse, cross country running/track and field.
The football team has won a 4A state championship in 1974, and 5A state championships in 1995, 2000, 2002, 2004, and 2005. The Track and Field (T&F) and Cross Country teams have won 31 State Championships. During the 2018-19 school year Girls’ and Boys' Cross Country, Girls’ and Boys' Indoor T&F, Girls' and Boys’ T&F all won State Championships. The varsity boys' basketball team also won second place in the 6A state championship in 2008 and 2010. The Homewood Boys' Soccer team has won four 5A state championships in 2003, 2005, 2006, and 2014.

Waldrop Stadium
Waldrop Stadium, in Homewood, Alabama (Bob Newton Field) is the home of the Homewood Patriots. The field is named after former head football coach Bob Newton, who led the Patriots to their five 5A wins. The stadium is home to the football, soccer, and track and field teams.

Football
Homewood won the class 4A state championship in 1974 and the class 5A state championships in 1995, 2000, 2002, 2004, and 2005.

Patriot Marching Band
The Homewood High School Patriot Marching Band is a large marching ensemble made up of students from Homewood High School. Nearly half of the high school's students participate in the band program as instrumentalists, dancers, flag corps members, or as managers.

The Homewood High School Patriot Marching Band participated in the 2018 Macy's Thanksgiving Day Parade, the ninth time it has performed in the parade, more times than any school from outside of the New York area. The band also participated in the 2022  Rose Parade, in Pasadena, California. This was the fifth time that this band has performed in this parade, which is more than any other band from Alabama. Accompanying the band during performances is the Star Spangled Girls' dance line and the Patriot Guard.

It has participated in many national and international events, listed below:
 United States Presidential Inaugural Parade in 2001 and 1989
 State of Alabama Inaugural Parade in 2003, 1999, 1995, 1991 and 1987
 Tournament of Roses Parade in 2022, 2014, 2009, 2003 and 1984
 Macy's Thanksgiving Day Parade in 2018, 2011, 2006, 2000, 1995, 1990, 1986, 1981 and 1978
 Fiesta Bowl Parade in 2004, 1999 and 1994
 Orange Bowl Parade in 2000
 St. Patrick's Day Parade in Dublin and  Limerick, Ireland in 1997 and 1993
 Lord Mayor Of Westminster's New Years Day Parade in 1990
 BBVA Compass Bowl (Birmingham Bowl) in 2012
 Drum Corps International World Class Finals in 1980, 1979

Notable alumni

 Chris Gray (1988), Former NFL offensive lineman
 Kevin Newsom (1990), United States Circuit Judge, Court of Appeals; Birmingham attorney and former law clerk to Justice David Souter, U.S. Supreme Court
 John Zimmerman (1992), World Champion & Olympic figure skater.
 Evan Mathis (2000), Former NFL offensive lineman
 Ronald Nored (2009), former point guard for Butler University and NBA assistant coach
 Aaron Ernest (2011), Sprinter for LSU - (HS) USA Today All-American and T&F News All-American, NCAA All-American, and World Jr. Silver Medalist in both the 100m and 200m in 2012
 Ameer Abdullah (2011), running-back for the Minnesota Vikings
 Paul Rogers, Academy-Award-nominated film editor (Everything Everywhere All At Once)

References

External links
 Homewood High School homepage
 Homewood Board of Education homepage
 The Homewood Tricorne

Public high schools in Alabama
Educational institutions established in 1972
Schools in Jefferson County, Alabama
1972 establishments in Alabama